Edmund Reeves (November 1821 – 10 December 1906) was an English first-class cricketer active 1848–52 who played for Surrey and Middlesex. He was born in Lambeth and died in Wimbledon. He played in 21 first-class matches.

References

1821 births
1906 deaths
English cricketers
Middlesex cricketers
Surrey cricketers
Marylebone Cricket Club cricketers
Gentlemen cricketers
Surrey Club cricketers
Gentlemen of England cricketers
Marylebone Cricket Club and Metropolitan Clubs cricketers